Les Compagnons de Saint-Laurent was a theatre company that was founded in August 1937 at Collège de Saint-Laurent in Saint-Laurent, Quebec, by , , and Léonide Lavinge. According to The Canadian Encyclopedia it was the "[...] most influential theatrical company in the history of Québec". The company dissolved in 1951.

History  
Financial support at the debut of the company was provided by Léonide (Bobby) Lavinge, the father of François Lavinge, one of the original members of the company. Although his father did not support his son's choice of profession as an actor (and disinherited him for this reason), he still provided considerable financial support of the company. Among others, he bought the property and the farm which served as a rehearsal place for the company. According to his son, the building was cold and difficult to heat in the winter and the members of the company did not like those conditions. Léonide would eventually sell the property, which was later purchased by Félix Leclerc for his home residence. The property is now a Quebec cultural heritage site.

In 1947, Les Compagnons de Saint-Laurent were awarded the Trophée Bessborough at a festival in London, Ontario.

Notable actors  

 
 Jean-Louis Roux
 Jean Gascon
 Georges Groulx
 Guy Provost
 Denise Pelletier
 Gilles Pelletier
 Hélène Loiselle
 Jean Coutu
 Guy Mauffette
 Félix Leclerc
 Lucille Cousineau
 Denise Vachon
 Thérèse Cadorette
 Jean Duceppe 
 
 
 Gabriel Gascon
 Charlotte Boisjoli
 Jean-Pierre Masson

Legacy 

In 1996, a park was named after the theatre company. A former boarding school was demolished when the park was being established. It is located on 4375 Cartier Street.

In 1997, Jean-Claude Labrecque directed the film L'Adventure des Compagnons de Saint-Laurent, a documentary about the history and impact of the company and the work of Émile Legault. The film was produced by the National Film Board of Canada and Verseau International.

See also  
 Théâtre du Rideau Vert
 Théâtre du Nouveau Monde

References 

Theatre companies in Canada
Companies based in Montreal